East Kane is an unincorporated community in Wetmore Township in McKean County, Pennsylvania, United States. East Kane is located along Pennsylvania Route 321 southeast of Kane.

References

Unincorporated communities in McKean County, Pennsylvania
Unincorporated communities in Pennsylvania